Frelighsburg is a municipality in the Estrie region of southern Quebec, Canada, on the border with Vermont. It is at the foot of Mount Pinnacle, part of the Appalachian Mountains.

Administratively, it is within the Brome-Missisquoi Regional County Municipality, in the Estrie. Its population, as of the Canada 2011 Census, was 1,094.

History
Frelighsburg is on land that was originally inhabited by the Abenaki. It was established as a colony in the late 1790s by American Loyalists, including pioneer Abram Freligh, a physician of German origin who lived in Clinton, New York. The sawmill built by his son in 1839, and several other buildings from the 19th century are considered historical monuments. Prior to being named Frelighsburgh it was named Conroy's Mills, named after another mill owner, and Slab City because of the great quantities of sawdust and slabs (slang for bark) that were there.

Geography

Demographics

Infrastructure
Frelighsburg is crossed by the Route 237. Route 213 starts in Frelighsburgh.

Gallery

See also
List of municipalities in Quebec

References

External links
Municipality of Frelighsburg - Official Site
 

Municipalities in Quebec
Incorporated places in Brome-Missisquoi Regional County Municipality
Designated places in Quebec